Ehrhart's Mill Historic District is a national historic district located along Saucon Creek at Lower Saucon Township, Northampton County, Pennsylvania.  The district includes 9 contributing buildings, 2 contributing sites, and 4 contributing structures associated with a 19th and early 20th century grist mill.  The buildings include a small barn, the stone grist mill (destroyed), and three stone or brick vernacular houses.  The mill is a three-story, five level stone building with a slate covered gambrel roof.  The most prominent structure is an iron Pratt truss bridge built in 1867, and known as County Bridge #16.  The mill was destroyed by fire.

It was added to the National Register of Historic Places in 1987.

References

Historic districts in Northampton County, Pennsylvania
Grinding mills in Pennsylvania
Historic districts on the National Register of Historic Places in Pennsylvania
National Register of Historic Places in Northampton County, Pennsylvania
Grinding mills on the National Register of Historic Places in Pennsylvania